Muhammad Jamil Ahmad Mulla (born 12 December 1946) is a Saudi engineer who was minister of communications and information technology from 2003 to 2014.

Early life and education
Mulla was born in Madinah on 12 December 1946. He is a graduate of King Saud University where he received a bachelor of science degree in electrical engineering in 1972. Then he obtained a master of science degree in telecommunications from the University of Colorado at Boulder in 1979. He also participated in various training programs in different countries.

Career
Mulla began his career at the ministry of post, telegraph and telephone in 1972, working initially as a radio engineer and then as an electrical engineer. Later he served as a Riyadh province manager and general manager of the central region for telecommunications. In June 2001, Mullah was named as the governor of the Saudi Telecom Authority. Next, he was appointed assistant deputy minister and then deputy minister of post, telegraph and telephone in charge of operation and maintenance affairs. He then became the governor of the Saudi communications commission.

Mullah was appointed minister of communications and information technology when the office established on 1 May 2003. His term ended on 8 December 2014 when Fahd bin Matad bin Shafaq Al Hamad was appointed to the post.

References

External links

20th-century Saudi Arabian engineers
21st-century Saudi Arabian engineers
21st-century Saudi Arabian politicians
1946 births
Electrical engineers
Government ministers of Saudi Arabia
King Saud University alumni
Living people
University of Colorado Boulder alumni